Rozanne Marel Pollack (born April 29, 1948) is an American bridge player from Englewood Cliffs, New Jersey.

Dr. Pollack is a graduate of Radcliffe College and Columbia University.

Bridge accomplishments

Wins

 North American Bridge Championships (12)
 Smith Life Master Women's Pairs (1) 2011 
 Machlin Women's Swiss Teams (1) 1986 
 Wagar Women's Knockout Teams (3) 1990, 1993, 1999 
 Sternberg Women's Board-a-Match Teams (3) 1988, 1997, 2001 
 Chicago Mixed Board-a-Match (4) 1985, 2004, 2005, 2006

Runners-up

 North American Bridge Championships
 Rockwell Mixed Pairs (1) 2004 
 North American Pairs (1) 2012 
 Smith Life Master Women's Pairs (1) 2013 
 Wagar Women's Knockout Teams (2) 1985, 2009 
 Sternberg Women's Board-a-Match Teams (3) 1986, 1987, 2006 
 Chicago Mixed Board-a-Match (1) 1991

References

External links
 

1948 births
American contract bridge players
People from Englewood Cliffs, New Jersey
Radcliffe College alumni
Columbia University alumni
Living people
Place of birth missing (living people)